The new Batu Gajah railway station is a Malaysian railway station stationed at the northeastern side of and named after the town of Batu Gajah, Perak.  It was officiated by Dato’ Sri Chan Kong Choy in 2008.

The new station replaces an old station at Jalan Pusing in Batu Gajah town which was closed beginning 19 July 2005 when all services moved to the new station which was operating partially. The old, single platform wooden station was to have been converted into a museum.

Location and locality 
The station is located in Kampung Pisang, Batu Gajah in Kinta district of Perak, Malaysia, not far from Batu Gajah town. Most of the surrounding areas are KTMB depot and Akademi KTM. 

This station not only serves those from Batu Gajah, but also surrounding areas like Tanjung Tualang and even Lahat and Pusing in Ipoh city areas, as well as Pengkalan residential and business areas including Station 18. Passengers to and from Seri Iskandar also alight here, especially students of Universiti Teknologi Petronas (UTP) and Universiti Teknologi MARA campus around it.

Batu Gajah Railway Depot
After YTL Corp had announced their intentions to use KTM's Sentul Works for their Sentul East and Sentul West masterplan, KTM was planning to close the Intercity part of the Works and the Falim Depots as well because their Intercity motive power and rolling stock rarely terminate at the Works for maintenance or scrapping and no Intercity motive power ever stopped at the Falim Depots for damage inspections for years and was used as their Museum Warehouse before the depot's closing.

By August 2009, Batu Gajah railway depot replaced Sentul Works for KTM Intercity's motive power maintenance and Falim Depot for Intercity motive power and rolling stock damage inspections.  In addition, the depot is also used as starting test ground for newly arrived motive power or rolling stock.

Kinta District
KTM ETS railway stations
Railway stations in Perak